The Arrondissement of Virton is one of the five administrative arrondissements in the Walloon province of Luxembourg, Belgium.

The Administrative Arrondissement of Virton consists of the following municipalities:
 Chiny
 Étalle
 Florenville
 Habay
 Meix-devant-Virton
 Musson
 Rouvroy
 Saint-Léger
 Tintigny
 Virton

References 

Virton